Christopher Gadsden (February 16, 1724 – August 28, 1805) was an American politician who was the principal leader of the South Carolina Patriot movement during the American Revolution. He was a delegate to the Continental Congress, a brigadier general in the Continental Army during the American Revolutionary War, Lieutenant Governor of South Carolina, a merchant, and the designer of the Gadsden flag. He is a signatory to the Continental Association.

Early life
Gadsden was born in 1724 in Charleston, South Carolina. He was the son of Thomas Gadsden, who had been in the Royal Navy before becoming customs collector for the Port of Charleston. He was sent to school near Bristol, England. He returned to America in 1740 and served as an apprentice at a counting house in Philadelphia, Pennsylvania. He inherited a large fortune from his parents who died in 1741. From 1745 to 1746 he was a purser on a British warship during King George's War. He entered into mercantile ventures and by 1747 had earned enough to return to South Carolina and buy back the land his father had sold because he needed the money to pay off debts. He built Beneventum Plantation House in about 1750.

Views on slavery 
The National Park Service writes that "by 1774, he owned four stores, several merchant vessels, two rice plantations, a residential district in Charleston called Gadsdenboro, and a large wharf on the Cooper River." Christopher Gadsden was an enslaver, as were many rice plantation owners in South Carolina who used the labor of enslaved Africans to grow and sell agricultural products. In A Forgotten Founder: The Life and Legacy of Christopher Gadsden it states that, "at the time of his death, he owned enough slaves to 'divide my Estate real and personal as well as my negroes as otherwise into nineteen equal parts or shares, but it is unknown how many enslaved people he purchased, owned or used. Commentators have pointed out that because Gadsden was a trader and enslaved humans, a previous narrative of Gadsden's life as being ambivalent towards slavery is complicated at best, but most likely false. As was common for many men involved in the fight for independence from England, the concepts of freedom and liberty did not include enslaved Africans.

Seven Years War

Gadsden began his rise to prominence as a merchant and patriot in Charleston. He prospered as a merchant and built the wharf in Charleston that bears his name. Between its completion in 1767 until 1787 and 1803 to 1808, it is estimated that 40% of all African slaves (about 100,000 enslaved people) were brought to America through his wharf. He was captain of a militia company during a 1759 expedition against the Cherokee. He was first elected to the Commons House of Assembly in 1757 and began a long friction with autocratic royal governors. His re-election to the Commons in 1762 was beset with minor voting irregularities, which resulted in Governor Boone refusing to administer the oath of office for Gadsden and dissolving the entire Commons. This perceived excess of gubernatorial power led to a political culture in South Carolina of legislative dominance over the executive branch. 

In 1766, the assembly made him one of their delegates to the Stamp Act Congress in New York City, which was called to protest the Stamp Act. While his fellow delegates Thomas Lynch and John Rutledge served on committees to draft appeals to the House of Lords and Commons respectively, Gadsden refused any such assignment, since in his view the British parliament had no rights in the matter. He was outspoken in his support of the Declaration of Rights and Grievances produced by the Congress. His addresses brought him to the attention of Samuel Adams of Massachusetts, and the two began a long correspondence and friendship. Gadsden was eventually known as "the Sam Adams of the South".

Revolutionary years
On his return from New York, Gadsden became one of the founders and leaders of the Charleston Sons of Liberty. He had risen to the rank of lieutenant colonel in the militia. He was elected as a delegate to the First Continental Congress in 1774 and the Second Continental Congress the following year. He left Congress early in 1776 to assume command of the 1st South Carolina Regiment of the Continental Army and to serve in the Provincial Congress of South Carolina.In February 1776, South Carolina President John Rutledge named him a brigadier general in charge of the state's military forces. As the British prepared to attack Charleston, Major General Charles Lee ordered outlying positions abandoned. Rutledge and the local officers disagreed. A compromise was reached and as William Moultrie prepared the defenses on Sullivan's Island, Gadsden paid for, and his regiment built, a bridge that would allow their escape if the position were threatened. The British attack was repulsed.

In 1778, Gadsden was a member of the South Carolina convention that drafted a new state constitution. That same year he was named the lieutenant governor, to replace Henry Laurens who was away at the Continental Congress. He served in that office until 1780. Actually, for the first year and a half his office was called "Vice President of South Carolina," but when the new constitution was adopted, the title was changed to the modern usage.When the British laid siege to Charleston in 1780, John Rutledge, as president of the council, fled to North Carolina to ensure a "government in exile" should the city fall. Gadsden remained, along with Governor Rawlins Lowndes. General Benjamin Lincoln surrendered the Continental Army garrison on May 12 to General Henry Clinton. At the same time, Gadsden represented the civil government and surrendered the city. He was sent on parole to his Charleston house.

Prisoner of war
After Clinton returned to New York, the new British commander in the South, General Charles Cornwallis, changed the rules. On August 27, 1780, he arrested about 20 of the civil officers then on parole. They were marched as prisoners to a ship and taken to St. Augustine, Florida. When they arrived, Governor Patrick Tonyn offered the freedom of the town if they would give their parole. Most accepted, but Gadsden refused claiming that the British had already violated one parole, and he could not give his word to a false system. As a result, he spent the next 42 weeks in solitary confinement in a prison room at the old Spanish fortress of Castillo de San Marcos. When they were  released in 1781, they were sent by merchant ship to Philadelphia. Once there, Gadsden learned of the defeat of Cornwallis' subordinate Banastre Tarleton at Cowpens and Cornwallis' subsequent movement to Yorktown. Gadsden hurried home to help the restoration of South Carolina's civil government.

Later life

Gadsden was returned to South Carolina's House of Representatives, then meeting at Jacksonboro. At this session, Governor Randolph and de facto President Rutledge both surrendered their offices. Gadsden was elected as the governor but felt he had to decline. His health was still impaired from his imprisonment, and an active governor was needed since the British had not yet given up Charleston. So in 1782, John Mathews became the new governor. Gadsden was also a member of the state convention in 1788 and voted for ratification of the United States Constitution.

In 1798, he built the imposing house at 329 East Bay Street in the Ansonborough area of Charleston that remained in the family for more than a century; famous ironworker Philip Simmons built the gates that incorporate a snake motif, drawn from the "Don't Tread on Me" flag that Gadsden designed.

Gadsden was married three times and had four children with his second wife. The Gadsden Purchase of Arizona was named for his grandson James Gadsden. Another grandson, Christopher E. Gadsden, was the fourth Episcopal Bishop of South Carolina.

Gadsden died from an accidental fall on August 28, 1805, in Charleston, and is buried there in St. Philip's Churchyard.

References

Further reading
Godbold, E. Stanly, Jr., and Robert Woody. Christopher Gadsden and the American Revolution. 1983, The University of Tennessee Press, 1983. .
McDonough, Daniel. Christopher Gadsden and Henry Laurens: The Parallel Lives of Two American Patriots. Susquehanna University Press, 2000. .
Walsh, Richard, ed. The Writings of Christopher Gadsden, 1746–1805. University of South Carolina Press, 1966.

External links

 Retrieved on 2009-5-16

1724 births
1805 deaths
Accidental deaths from falls
Accidental deaths in South Carolina
American Revolutionary War prisoners of war held by Great Britain
Burials in South Carolina
Continental Congressmen from South Carolina
18th-century Anglicans
18th-century American politicians
Continental Army generals
Continental Army officers from South Carolina
Flag designers
Members of the South Carolina General Assembly
Politicians from Charleston, South Carolina
People of South Carolina in the American Revolution
American slave owners
Signers of the Continental Association